The Jackson Street Bridge is a bridge on the Passaic River between Newark and Harrison,  New Jersey. Opened in 1903 and substantially rehabilitated in 1991 it is listed on the New Jersey Register of Historic Places  (ID#1274) and is eligible for the National Register of Historic Places. The bridge was re-lamped in 2012.

The lower  of the 90-mile (140 km) long Passaic River downstream of the Dundee Dam is tidally influenced and navigable, but due to the limited maritime traffic the bridge is infrequently required to open. It is one of three functional vehicular and pedestrian swing bridges in the city, the others being the Clay Street Bridge and the Bridge Street Bridge. Since 1998, rules regulating drawbridge operations require a four-hour notice for them to be opened.

The bridge crosses the river at a point where former industrial uses are giving way to commercial, residential, and recreational development. The US Army Corps of Engineers is undertaking a rehabilitation of the river including oversight of environmental remediation and reconstruction of bulkheads.

At its southern end in the Newark Ironbound, the bridge crosses over Newark Riverfront Park and Raymond Boulevard, a major thoroughfare in the city between the Pulaski Skyway and Downtown Newark. It is adjacent to Riverbank Park.

At its northern end the bridge in Harrison begins a street named for Frank E. Rodgers, once one of the longest serving mayors of the United States. The district along the waterfront has been largely cleared of former industrial buildings and has become home to Red Bull Arena.

See also
List of bridges documented by the Historic American Engineering Record in New Jersey
List of bridges, tunnels, and cuts in Hudson County, New Jersey
List of crossings of the Lower Passaic River

References

External links

Jackson Street Bridge at historicbridges.org
Jackson Street Bridge image by Ronald C. Saari

Bridges completed in 1903
Bridges in Newark, New Jersey
Bridges in Hudson County, New Jersey
Swing bridges in the United States
Harrison, New Jersey
Bridges over the Passaic River
Road bridges in New Jersey
Historic American Engineering Record in New Jersey
1903 establishments in New Jersey